Sir Dryden Brook (25 August 1884 – 30 January 1971) was a Labour Party politician in the United Kingdom, and a Member of Parliament (MP) from 1945 to 1955.

Brook was a wool merchant in Halifax.  He served as a Labour Party member of Halifax Borough Council from 1940 until 1968.

In the Labour landslide at the 1945 general election, Brook was elected as Member of Parliament (MP) for Halifax, unseating the Conservative MP Gilbert Gledhill with a majority of over 10,000 votes.  He held the seat until the 1955 general election, when the Conservative Maurice Macmillan won with a majority of 1,535.

Alderman Brook was knighted in 1965.

Sources

References

External links 
 

1884 births
1971 deaths
Labour Party (UK) MPs for English constituencies
UK MPs 1945–1950
UK MPs 1950–1951
UK MPs 1951–1955
Knights Bachelor
Politicians awarded knighthoods